ROFLCon was a biennial convention of internet memes that took place in 2008, 2010 and 2012, featuring various internet celebrities. All three events were at the Massachusetts Institute of Technology. ROFLCon was first organized by a group of students from Harvard University led by Tim Hwang. According to Hwang, the inspiration for the conference was the September 23, 2007 meetup of fans of xkcd with its creator, Randall Munroe, in a park in North Cambridge, Massachusetts.

The name "ROFLCon" comes from the internet slang "ROFL", short for "rolling on the floor laughing", and "con", short for "convention".

At ROFLCon 2012, it was announced that there would not be another ROFLCon.

2008
The first ROFLCon was first announced in late 2007, and took place on April 25–26, 2008.

Various internet celebrities attended, such as the authors of the webcomics xkcd, Questionable Content and Dinosaur comics, Jay Maynard "The Tron Guy", Christopher "moot" Poole, Leeroy Jenkins, The Brothers Chaps, and many others.

Attendance was open to the public after pre-registration and a fee. The primary events of ROFLCon were moderated panel discussions with the Internet celebrities, and question and answer sessions with the audience. Several guest speakers gave talks on issues pertaining to internet culture. The convention ended with the "ROFLConcert", featuring live performances by Group X, Leslie Hall, Lemon Demon, Trocadero and Denny Blaze.

2010

The second ROFLCon took place from April 30 to May 1 at MIT. Passes were available from $45 for a student to $500 for a "Mystery Pass."

2012
The third and final ROFLCon took place on May 4–5, 2012.

Image gallery

References

External links

Official site
"ROFLCon final session: Cult leaders". The Guardian. April 27, 2008.
"ROFLCon Live Stream". Los Angeles Times Funny Pages. April 25, 2008.
"ROFLCon: Welcome to the Fame Revolution". Wired News. April 25, 2008.
"My ROFLCon Weekend: Breakfast with Tron Guy". NPR. April 28, 2008
The new fame: Internet celebrity. CNN. May 1, 2008.
"Bostonist Went To ROFLCon And All We Got Was This Brawndo Hangover". Bostonist. April 30, 2008.

Conventions in Massachusetts
Social events
Internet culture
Web-related events
Recurring events established in 2008
Recurring events disestablished in 2012